Salal Gaon is a village located in the Lakhimpur district in the northeastern Indian state of Assam. North Lakhimpur, Bihapuria, Dhakuakhona, Naoboicha, Narayanpur are the nearest towns to Salal Gaon.

Demographics
According to the 2011 census, 262 families reside in Salal village.  It has a population of 1243; 634 males and 609 females.  Female population is .961 per thousand male, which is higher than average population of Assam (.958).
Salal Gaon has an average literacy rate of 95.17%, higher than the state average of 72.19 %.

References

villages in Lakhimpur district